The Battle of Santa Rosa Island (October 9, 1861) was an unsuccessful Confederate attempt to take Union-held Fort Pickens on Santa Rosa Island, Florida.

Background 
Santa Rosa Island is a 40-mile barrier island in the U.S. state of Florida, thirty miles from the Alabama state border. At the western end stands Fort Pickens, which in the fall of 1861 was garrisoned by parts of the 1st, 2nd, and 5th U. S. artillery and the 3rd U.S. Infantry, under command of Col. Harvey Brown, of the 5th artillery. The 6th New York Volunteer Infantry, commanded by Col. William Wilson, was encamped outside the fort, a short distance east of it.

Battle 
After midnight on October 9, Brig. Gen. Richard Anderson crossed from the mainland to Santa Rosa Island with 1,200 men in two small steamers to surprise the Union troops at Camp Brown and if possible capture Fort Pickens. He landed on the north beach about four miles east of Fort Pickens and divided his command into three columns. After proceeding about three miles, the Confederates surprised the 6th Regiment, New York Volunteers, in Camp Brown and routed the regiment. Gen. Anderson then adopted a defensive stance to entice the Federals to leave the fort and attack. Receiving reinforcements, Col. Harvey Brown sallied against the Confederates, who reembarked and returned to the mainland.

The Union loss was 14 killed, 29 wounded and 24 captured or missing. General Braxton Bragg and Lieutenant Hamel, commanding the Confederate forces at Pensacola, reported their loss as "30 or 40 killed and wounded," but an undocumented Confederate newspaper, found by Lieut. Seeley a few days after the occurrence, gave the total casualties as 175. This claim was likely an exaggeration. Maj. Israel Vogdes, of the 1st artillery, was captured, and on the Confederate side Gen. Anderson was severely wounded. The camp of the 6th N. Y., which was the main objective of the raid, was largely destroyed, meaning the raid could be deemed a success.

Fort Pickens and the battle site are preserved within the Gulf Islands National Seashore.

Order of battle

Union Forces
Department of Florida: Col. Harvey Brown
6th New York Zouave Infantry, Col. William Wilson
Vodges' Command – Major Israel Vogdes (c), Capt. John McL. Hildt
Company A, 1st Artillery – Lieutenant Frank E. Taylor
Company E, 3rd Infantry – Captain John McL. Hildt
Company G, 3rd New York Infantry – Captain Dobie
Arnold’s Command – Major Lewis Golding Arnold
Company C, 3rd Infantry – Lieutenant Alexander Shipley
Company H, 2nd Artillery – Captain James M. Robertson

Confederate Forces
Brig. Gen. Richard Heron Anderson

Demolition Team --- Lieutenant James H. Hallonquist
1st Battalion – Colonel James R. Chalmers
Detachment, 10th Mississippi Infantry
Detachment, 1st Alabama Infantry
2nd Battalion – Colonel J. Patton Anderson
3 Companies, 7th Alabama Infantry
2 Companies, 1st Louisiana Infantry (Regulars)
2 Companies, 1st Florida Infantry
3rd Battalion - Colonel John K. Jackson
Detachment, 5th Georgia Infantry
Detachment, Georgia Infantry Battalion
Artillery
Homer’s Artillery Company - Lieutenant Hollonquist
Confederate Naval Forces
CSS Neaffie

See also
 History of Pensacola, Florida
 The Library of Congress Prints and Photographs Division (The Battle of Santa Rosa Island)

References

Citations

Bibliography 
 
 Santa Rosa Island - A History
 CWSAC Report Update and Resurvey: Individual Battlefield Profiles

Santa Rosa Island
Santa Rosa Island
Santa Rosa
Escambia County, Florida
1861 in the American Civil War
1861 in Florida
Gulf Islands National Seashore
Santa Rosa Island (Florida)
October 1861 events